Italian submarine Alagi was an  built in 1930s serving in the Regia Marina during World War II. She was named after the Amba Alagi mountain in Ethiopia.

Design and description
The Adua-class submarines were essentially repeats of the preceding . They displaced  surfaced and  submerged.

For surface running, the boats were powered by two  diesel engines, each driving one propeller shaft. When submerged each propeller was driven by a  electric motor. They could reach  on the surface and  underwater.

The boats were armed with six internal  torpedo tubes, four in the bow and two in the stern. They were also armed with one  deck gun for combat on the surface. The light anti-aircraft armament consisted of one or two pairs of   machine guns.

Construction and Career 
Alagi was built in the CRDA shipyard, in Monfalcone. She was laid down on 19 March 1936, launched on 15 November that year and commissioned on 6 March 1937.

On 11 May 1937 Alagi was assigned to the 23rd Squadron based in Naples, from where she conducted training in the Dodecanese.  During the Spanish Civil War, between 27 August and 4 September 1937, she carried out a special mission.  In 1939 she was reassigned for some time to the base in Cagliari and then to  Messina. In 1940 Alagi was assigned to 71st Squadron (V Submarine Group) based at Cagliari.

On 10 June 1940, at the outbreak of hostilities, Alagi was on patrol in the waters off Bizerta. She remained on station until 20 June without sighting any enemy ships.

From 5 to 11 June 1941, Alagi, under command of captain Giulio Contreas, patrolled 20 miles northeast of Ras Azzaz. She sighted a small enemy ship and tried to launch an attack, but it was interrupted by a second ship which detected Alagi and headed in her direction, forcing her to disengage.

At 10:47 on 12 June 1941, while returning to Messina, Alagi was attacked with two bombs and machine guns off Benghazi by a British Sunderland aircraft. The boat's crew responded with anti-aircraft weapons forcing the plane to turn away, probably because it was hit.

On 18 July 1941 she patrolled off of Cap Bougaroûn. On 22 July she detected Force H but was unable to attack it, and was subject to anti-submarine search by escorts.

During August 1941 Alagi patrolled between Sardinia and La Galite Island.

She spent November and December 1941 patrolling off Cape Fer.

In the late afternoon of 14 January 1942, in the Strait of Sicily, Alagi sighted a British naval formation and at 21:05 launched two torpedoes, which did not hit any targets.

On 8 June 1942, roughly 20 nm North of Cape Bon Alagi, under command of captain Sergio Puccini, fired three torpedoes at a naval column (later identified as friendly convoy from Naples to Tripoli). One torpedo hit and sunk the Italian destroyer Antoniotto Usodimare in a friendly fire incident  (141 killed and 165 survivors).

The tanker was later re-floated, towed to Turkey and scrapped in late 1943.

In August 1942 Alagi operated along the Regia Marina and Luftwaffe to intercept and block an Allied convoy to Malta (Operation Pedestal).

At 21:12 cruiser  was hit forward by one of four torpedoes and sustained damage to bow structure.  was able to make 25 knots and remained with the convoy to continue operating in defense of merchants. The other 2 torpedoes hit and sunk M/V Clan Ferguson which was previously damaged by a bomb from Ju 88.

On 8 November 1942, while sailing submerged to her area of operation near Bizerta, she collided underwater with another Italian submarine  and suffered serious damage to her tower and had to turn back and return to Naples.

In December she first patrolled between Cape Bougaroun, island of La Galite and Cape Fer and then from 29 December near Bona, Algeria.

In January 1943 Alagi patrolled northeast of Bona.

From February to June 1943 she conducted several patrols south and southwest of Sardinia.
 
In July 1943 Alagi first patrolled south of Sardinia, and later provided defensive screen in the waters of Sicily. Alagi launched three torpedoes while on surface. After a minute and 45 seconds a violent explosion was heard, but no information about this action was ever reported in British official documentation.

On 3 September 1943 Alagi was deployed to the Gulf of Salerno, and on 7 September under the Zeta Plan, she was sent along with ten other submarines to the Tyrrhenian Sea, between the Gulf of Gaeta and the Gulf of Paola to intercept an anticipated Anglo-American landing in southern Italy.

On 9 September 1943, following the announcement of the Armistice, Alagi which at that time was about sixty miles from Augusta headed for Malta, where she arrived on 16 September 1943 along with five other submarines escorted by destroyer . Upon arrival she surrender to the Allies. On 13 October 1943 Alagi together with fifteen other submarines left Malta for mainland Italy.

In October 1943, Alagi was transferred to Haifa where she was employed as a training unit for British troops and as a shipping vessel for supplies to the Aegean Islands.  She returned to Taranto in December 1944, where she remained inactive until the end of the war.  She was sold for scrap on 1 February 1948.

Notes

References 

Adua-class submarines
World War II submarines of Italy
1936 ships
Ships built by Cantieri Riuniti dell'Adriatico
Ships built in Monfalcone
Friendly fire incidents of World War II